Tazeh Kand-e Anhar (also Romanized as Tāzeh Kand-e Anhar; also known as Sheshmāl and Tāzeh Kand) is a village in Rowzeh Chay Rural District, in the Central District of Urmia County, West Azerbaijan Province, Iran. At the 2006 census, its population was 96, in 17 families.

References 

Populated places in Urmia County